János Fürst (8 August 1935 – 3 January 2007) was a Hungarian-born conductor and violinist.

Biography 
Fürst originally studied the violin at the Franz Liszt Academy of Music in his native Budapest.  After the 1956 Soviet invasion of Hungary, he continued studies at the conservatory in Brussels.  He attended the Conservatoire de Paris and there won a Premier Prix.  He took a job in 1958 with the Radio Éireann Symphony Orchestra, and developed his career as an orchestra leader.

In 1963, Fürst founded the Irish Chamber Orchestra, and developed his conducting career from that point.  On the formation of the Ulster Orchestra in 1966, Fürst became its concertmaster, and later its assistant conductor in 1971.  He held positions as Chief Conductor and Music Director with orchestras in Malmö (1974–77), Aalborg (1980–83), Dublin, Winterthur (1990–94) and was Chief Guest Conductor of the Helsinki Philharmonic Orchestra.

Fürst was music director of the Opéra de Marseille from 1981 to 1990.  He was also a frequent guest at English National Opera, Scottish Opera and the Royal Stockholm Opera.  In 1978 he conducted the premiere of Salome by Sir Peter Maxwell Davies and subsequently recorded it.

He also made numerous recordings for Vox Records with the Bamberg Symphony Orchestra, including some rarely heard orchestral music of Tchaikovsky released in the mid-1970s; some of the recordings have been reissued on CD.

Fürst was known as a fine teacher. A number of his students at the Paris Conservatoire won prestigious conducting competitions. He worked with youth orchestras including the National Youth Orchestra of Great Britain. Late in life he was invited to become head of orchestral conducting at Royal College of Music in London, but he did not live enough to take up the post.

Death
Fürst died of cancer in Paris in 2007.  He was married three times. His first wife, Annette (now Annette Kirshbaum), his third wife and two sons survive him.

Awards and nominations

ARIA Music Awards
The ARIA Music Awards is an annual awards ceremony that recognises excellence, innovation, and achievement across all genres of Australian music. They commenced in 1987. 

! 
|-
| 1995
| Powerhouse Three Poems of Byron – Capriccio Nocturnes Unchained Melody (with Adelaide Symphony Orchestra & David Porcelijn)
| Best Classical Album
| 
| 
|-

References

External links 
 Biography

1935 births
2007 deaths
Academics of the Royal College of Music
Conservatoire de Paris alumni
Academic staff of the Conservatoire de Paris
Franz Liszt Academy of Music alumni
Deaths from cancer in France
20th-century conductors (music)
Concertmasters
Hungarian classical violinists
Male classical violinists
Hungarian conductors (music)
Male conductors (music)
Hungarian expatriates in France
Hungarian Jews
Jewish classical musicians
Musicians from Budapest
RTÉ Performing Groups
20th-century classical violinists
20th-century Hungarian male musicians